Manūchehr [mænuː'tʃer]  (older Persian Manōčihr, Avestan 𐬨𐬀𐬥𐬎𐬱𐬗𐬌𐬚𐬭𐬀  Manuščiθra), is the eighth Shah of the Pishdadian dynasty of Persia according to Shahnameh. He is the first of the legendary Iranian Shahs who ruled Iran after the breakup of the world empire of Manūchehr's great-grandfather, Fereydūn.

Manūchehr was the grandson of Iraj, who was the son of Fereydūn, and he avenged the death of Īrāj at the hands of Fereydūn's other two sons, Salm and Tur. From the death of Tūr in Manūchehr's war of vengeance sprang a war between the peoples of Iran and Turan that would last for centuries, until the reign of Kai Khosrow.

Manūchehr died after a reign of 120 years, and was succeeded by his son Nowzar.

Family Tree

Sources and references 
 Abolqasem Ferdowsi, Dick Davis trans. (2006), Shahnameh: The Persian Book of Kings , modern English translation (abridged), current standard
 Warner, Arthur and Edmond Warner, (translators) The Shahnama of Firdausi, 9 vols. (London: Keegan Paul, 1905–1925) (complete English verse translation)
 Shirzad Aghaee, Nam-e kasan va ja'i-ha dar Shahnama-ye Ferdousi (Personalities and Places in the Shahnama of Ferdousi, Nyköping, Sweden, 1993.
 Jalal Khāleghi Motlagh, Editor, The Shahnameh, to be published in 8 volumes (c. 500 pages each), consisting of six volumes of text and two volumes of explanatory notes. See: Center for Iranian Studies, Columbia University.

External links
A king's book of kings: the Shah-nameh of Shah Tahmasp, an exhibition catalog from The Metropolitan Museum of Art (fully available online as PDF), which contains material on Manuchehr

 
Mythological kings
Pishdadian dynasty
Longevity myths